Nightmare is the seventh studio album from the Japanese band Nightmare. Like all the band's recent releases, this album was released in three different editions, each with different artwork. The 2 limited edition albums contain bonus DVD tracks, while the regular edition includes a bonus track titled "Dazzle". The album peaked at #10 in the Oricon charts and sold 16,971 copies in the first week.

Track listing

Limited Edition A

Limited Edition B

Single Information

Rem_
Released: September 22, 2009
Oricon Chart Peak Position: #3
First Week Sales: 18,967

A:Fantasia
Released: June 23, 2010
Oricon Chart Peak Position: #5
First Week Sales: 16,568

Vermilion
Released: May 18, 2011
Oricon Chart Peak Position: #6
First Week Sales: 19,242

Sleeper
Released: September 7, 2011
Oricon Chart Peak Position: #7

Notes

References

2011 albums
Nightmare (Japanese band) albums
Avex Group albums
Japanese-language albums